Loch Fad is a freshwater loch on the Isle of Bute in Scotland.

Its name means "long loch" in Scottish Gaelic. It lies on the Highland Boundary Fault.

It is the site of one of the largest rainbow trout cage farms in the UK.

In 2018, it was used for tests of Donald Campbell's boat, Bluebird.

References

Isle of Bute
Lochs of Scottish islands